Martyn Pick is a British animator and director. Pick is recognised for his distinctive fusion of live-action and animation, and the fluid, painterly style of his film-making.

Martyn Pick’s credits include the 2009 film The Age of Stupid as animation director; London 2012, the promotional film for the 2012 Olympics; and the celebrated BBC promotional trailers for the Euro 2004 soccer tournament; and the Budweiser 2001 NBA commercials.

Martyn Pick studied film and fine art at Central Saint Martins College of Art and Design and the crossover of painting and cinema has driven his work ever since.

Animation work

Early works

Early animated films such as "Spectres" (1987)"Taboo of Dirt" (1988) and "Signature"(BFI New Directors Award 1990) were characterised by raw gritty charcoal drawing, wild fluid movement and brutal subject matter. At odds with dominant commercial cartoon style they were screened in art galleries, international film festivals and on television establishing his distinctive voice as an animator and filmmaker.

In the 1990s working as a commercial director in Soho production companies Pick applied his style to many commercials, promos and TV idents. He began to introduce live-action performance, CGI and digital compositing into the expressionist flow of his animation.

In the Channel 4 commissioned short film "PLAZA" (2000) which was screened at film festivals including London and Edinburgh he created a tension between a savage animation subconscious and the placid live action reality that it shatters.

This led to the FilmFour commission "GREEN" which was his first pure live-action drama. "PLAZA" was also the basis of a commercial for Budweiser for the US which used the same abrasive mix of raw scratched animation corroding live-action. At the same time he directed six high profile sixty second commercials for the American corporation ADM through the agency FCB. These were a strong commercial application of all the experiments with integrating live action and CGI into fluid painterly hand animation.

They received massive exposure on US networks and won the Gold Plaque for Animation at the Chicago Film Festival.

Recent works

In 2004 he directed his biggest ever job in the UK which was the BBC promotional trailers for the EURO 2004 tournament in which live-action of famous European footballers were treated in an eclectic mix of painterly styles.

Soon after he completed his first live-action commercial for the UK. In 2006 he worked as animation consultant on Brett Morgens  documentary feature Chicago 10.

In 2007 he started work as animation director on Franny Armstrong's climate change documentary feature The Age of Stupid (Spanner Films, Passion Pictures). In this he blended live action, CGI and matte paintings with a painterly, cinematic look. This award winning film was released to intense media interest and acclaim in March 2009.

In 2008 he was commissioned by Film London and the London Development Agency to make "London" a five-minute film celebrating the capitals edge and diversity in the run up to the 2012 Olympics. This made particular use of a technique he had developed in the test film "Blythborough" where he painted directly into live action footage using digital tools, making the digital manipulation of live action more direct and spontaneous. The resulting film produced by Th1ng was premiered at the Beijing Olympics.

Recently he has completed a motion graphics/live action promo for U2 and is developing a feature based on his graphic novel "Siege" as well as pursuing gallery and film projects.

Ultramarines

Ultramarines: The Movie is Pick's first feature film as Director. Ultramarines: The Movie is a 70-minute CGI, sci-fi, thriller, set in Games Workshop's fictional Warhammer 40,000 universe and based around the Ultramarines Chapter of Space Marines (Warhammer 40,000). The screenplay was written by Black Library author Dan Abnett.

References

External links
Article on apengine.org 
Martyn Pick's website

Living people
British animators
British animated film directors
Year of birth missing (living people)